Iskandar Zulkarnain bin Zainuddin (born 24 May 1991) is a Malaysian badminton player and coach.
He represented Malaysia as the third singles in the 2018 Thomas Cup and helped Malaysia qualify for the quarter finals.

Iskandar was appointed as part of the Irish badminton coaching staff in 2021. Iskander has further gone back to Malaysia, but will return to coach in Ireland later in 2022.

Achievements

Summer Universiade 
Men's singles

World Junior Championships 
Boys' singles

Asian Junior Championships 
Boys' singles

BWF Grand Prix 
The BWF Grand Prix has two levels, the BWF Grand Prix and Grand Prix Gold. It is a series of badminton tournaments sanctioned by the Badminton World Federation (BWF) since 2007.

Men's singles

  BWF Grand Prix Gold tournament
  BWF Grand Prix tournament

BWF International Challenge/Series 
Men's singles

Men's doubles

  BWF International Challenge tournament
  BWF International Series tournament

Record Against Selected Opponents 
Head to head (H2H) against international challenges.

  Son Wan-Ho 1-1
  Lee Dong-Keun 2-2
  Jan O Jorgensen 0-2
  Ng Ka Long Angus 3-2
  Wong Wing Ki 0-1
  Chou Tien-Chen 0-2
  Hsu Jen-Hao 1-1
  Wang Tzu-Wei 0-1
  Lee Zii Jia 0-1
  Daren Liew 1-0
  Anthony Sinisuka Ginting 2-0
  Ihsan Maulana Mustofa 2-1
  Taufik Hidayat 0-1
  Tommy Sugiarto 0-3
  Kento Momota 0-1
  Takuma Ueda 1-0

References

External links 

1991 births
Living people
Sportspeople from Kuala Lumpur
Malaysian people of Malay descent
Malaysian male badminton players
Badminton coaches
Badminton players at the 2014 Asian Games
Asian Games bronze medalists for Malaysia
Asian Games medalists in badminton
Medalists at the 2014 Asian Games
Competitors at the 2013 Southeast Asian Games
Competitors at the 2015 Southeast Asian Games
Competitors at the 2017 Southeast Asian Games
Southeast Asian Games medalists in badminton
Southeast Asian Games silver medalists for Malaysia
Southeast Asian Games bronze medalists for Malaysia
Universiade bronze medalists for Malaysia
Universiade medalists in badminton
Medalists at the 2013 Summer Universiade
21st-century Malaysian people